Golofa is a genus of rhinoceros beetles. The name Golofa is the indigenous name used for these beetles in Venezuela, and was adopted as a genus name when originally described in 1837; the genus name is masculine in gender, following ICZN Article 30.2.3.

Description 

Golofa are large scarabs, and the males typically have a single horn on the head and another horn centrally on the prothorax; the horns are often elongate, and often curve towards each other.

Species 
Golofa aegeon (Drury, 1773)
Golofa antiquus Arrow, 1911
Golofa argentina Arrow, 1911
Golofa claviger (Linnaeus, 1771)
Golofa cochlearis Ohaus, 1910
Golofa costaricensis Bates, 1888
Golofa eacus Burmeister, 1847
Golofa gaujoni Lachaume, 1985
Golofa globulicornis Dechambre, 1975
Golofa hirsutus Ratcliffe, 2003
Golofa imbellis Bates, 1888
Golofa imperialis Thomson, 1858
Golofa incas Hope, 1837
Golofa inermis Thomson, 1859
Golofa minutus
Golofa obliquicornis Dechambre, 1975
Golofa paradoxus Dechambre, 1975
Golofa pelagon Burmeister, 1847
Golofa pizarro Hope, 1837
Golofa porteri Hope, 1837
Golofa pusillus Arrow, 1911
Golofa solisi Ratcliffe, 2003
Golofa spatha Dechambre, 1989
Golofa tepaneneca Morón, 1995
Golofa tersander (Burmeister, 1847)
Golofa testudinarius Prell, 1934
Golofa unicolor (Bates, 1891)
Golofa xiximeca Morón, 1995

References

External links

 List of species

Dynastinae